İzmir Metro is a light metro system in İzmir, Turkey that is in the process of being extended with new stations being put in service.

Overview

By 1990, it was thought that the existing public transport system in Izmir could no longer support the growing population. A plan was thought of to build a rapid transit network by rail to cope with this. A contract was signed in 1993, and the handover was in 1994. Construction had begun in 1995 and it was completed successfully in around 4 years. In May 2000, the system came into public service. Up to that moment, the total cost of the system had been $US600 million. Yapı Merkezi was the main contractor for all design and civil works (tunnels, bridges, viaducts, stations, tracks, infrastructure, depots and workshops) as well as the third-rail power system.

AdTranz was responsible for the rolling stock and the signalling, power-supply and communication systems. (ABB Traction was subsequently purchased by Daimler and became AdTranz only to be purchased later by Bombardier.)
The Izmir Light Rail Vehicle (LRV) is tailor-made for the LRTS.

All LRVs are self-powered and the drive and braking systems (with wheel-slip protection) are controlled by on-board computer. A train consists of two to five vehicles with driver's cabin at each end. The LRV is a six-axle articulated unit with three bogies. The first and last bogies are powered while the articulated bogie is trailing.
The auxiliary power system is based on a static converter-inverter, supplied from a 750 VDC third rail and supplying 3-phase x 400 VAC at 50 Hz for compressor, fans, lights, battery charging, etc. The 24 VDC battery system supplies the on-board computer as well as other safety systems such as automatic train control (ATC), train radio, passenger displays, emergency lights, etc. The tunnel safety aspects have top priority.

A more ambitious rapid transit system, named İZBAN connects the north of the city, Aliağa to the south terminus of Cumaovası, via Adnan Menderes Airport and several other important financial and commercial areas such as Karşıyaka and Alsancak. The İzban and Metro will provide interchange with each other at Halkapınar station.

Basic fare on the Metro is 3.56 TL for adult passengers and 1.64 TL for student passengers if the İzmirimkart card is used. By the end of 2011, the Metro, or any other transport system in the city will no longer accept cash, or the jeton, (token) which is brought by cash and used to pass the ticket barriers at the stations. The Metro carries about 30 million passengers/year and to the end of September 2005 160 million passengers had travelled since the opening in May 2000.

Stations

Planned extensions

Network map

See also
 İZBAN
 Rail transport in İzmir
 Tram İzmir

References

External links

 İzmir Metro – official website 
 İzmir at UrbanRail.net

 
750 V DC railway electrification
Rail transport in İzmir